Disney  Junior Israel is a digital Israeli-language television station owned by The Walt Disney Company. 
In Israel, the channel launched on 9 September 2009 as Playhouse Disney (having its own channel and morning block on the Israeli version of Disney Channel) became Disney Junior on 18 July 2011 on Yes satellite and on 27 November 2013 on HOT Cable. Its programming is aimed at young children and their parents.

References

External links

 
Disney Junior Israel on Facebook
Disney Junior Israel on YouTube

Children's television networks
Television channels in Israel
2011 establishments in Israel
Television channels and stations established in 2011
Israel

he:דיסני ג'וניור ישראל